Nahi Gewog (Dzongkha: ན་ཧི་) is a gewog (village block) of Wangdue Phodrang District, Bhutan.

References

Gewogs of Bhutan
Wangdue Phodrang District